We Can Breathe under Alcohol is the second full-length album by An Angle, released in 2005.

Production
The album employed more than 50 musicians over its ten tracks.

Critical reception
Drowned in Sound wrote that "from main man Kris Anaya's confessional lyrics to the band's summery flourishes, We Can Breathe Under Alcohol is a surprising and satisfying listen."

Track listing
"Green Water" – 4:19   
"A Way With Words" – 3:55  
"True Love" – 4:59  
"Angry Drunk" – 6:16  
"White Horse" – 4:14  
"Born In A Bottle" – 8:41  
"Competitive Love, Competitive Drugs" – 3:45  
"Whales Talk, Whales Walk" – 5:14  
"Change The World" – 5:42
"St. Augustine" – 7:24

References

An Angle albums
2005 albums
Drive-Thru Records albums